Zug Chollermüli railway station is a railway station in the municipality of Zug, in the Swiss canton of Zug. It is located at the junction of the standard gauge Zug–Lucerne and Zürich–Zug lines of Swiss Federal Railways, although no trains on the latter stop here.

In the past, the station Kollermühle had been at this location (1902 to 1966).

Services 
The following services stop at Zug Chollermüli:

References

External links 
 
 

Railway stations in the canton of Zug
Swiss Federal Railways stations
Railway stations in Switzerland opened in 2004